Sanshū or Sanshu may refer to:

Sanshu, Huai'an (三树镇), town in Huaiyin District, Huai'an, Jiangsu, China
Yamashiro Province, or 
Mikawa Province, or 
Sanuki Province, or 
Sanshu Inu, a Japanese dog breed